Carnagh West Ringfort is a ringfort and National Monument located in County Roscommon, Ireland.

Location

Carnagh West Ringfort is located halfway between Lough Funshinagh and Lough Ree.

History and description
Carnagh West Ringfort is a rath or ringfort with foundations of rectangular huts. The double-walling suggests a Stone Age date. The townland name is from the Irish carnach, "abounding in heaps/cairns", due to the large number of raths in the area.

References

National Monuments in County Roscommon
Archaeological sites in County Roscommon